Amphelissa is an extinct genus of paleozoic gastropod in the family Helicotomidae. The genus was first named by British paleontologist Robert Etheridge, Junior. Amphelissa lived during the Devonian period in Australia, and was a suspension feeder.

Species
 Amphelissa carinatum
 Amphelissa isisensis

References

Paleozoic molluscs